Holly Grove is a Southern plantation with a  historic house located in Centreville, Mississippi, USA.

History
The plantation was established in 1812 by Duncan Stewart. The two-story mansion, designed in the Federal architectural style, was built prior to Stewart's death in 1820.

Architectural significance
The mansion has been listed on the National Register of Historic Places since October 21, 1988.

References

Plantation houses in Mississippi
Houses in Wilkinson County, Mississippi
Federal architecture in Mississippi
Houses on the National Register of Historic Places in Mississippi
National Register of Historic Places in Wilkinson County, Mississippi
1812 establishments in Mississippi Territory